Glenn Farr is a film and TV editor who was one of the five film editors to win the Academy Award for Best Film Editing during the 56th Academy Awards for the film The Right Stuff. He shared his win with Lisa Fruchtman, Tom Rolf, Stephen A. Rotter and Douglas Stewart.

Selected filmography

Akeelah and the Bee (2006)
Career Opportunities (1991)
Shattered (1991)
The Serpent and the Rainbow (1988)
Nothing in Common (1986)
Commando (1985)
Runaway (1984)
The Right Stuff (1983)
This Is Elvis (1981)
Harry and Tonto (1974) (assistant editor)
Elvis on Tour (1972) (post-production coordinator)

References

External links

American film editors
Living people
Best Film Editing Academy Award winners
Year of birth missing (living people)